Johannes Heinrich Matthaei (born 4 May 1929) is a German biochemist. He is best known for his unique contribution to solving the genetic code on 15 May 1961.

Career 
Whilst a post-doctoral visitor in the laboratory of Marshall Warren Nirenberg at the NIH in Bethesda, Maryland, he discovered that a synthetic RNA polynucleotide, composed of a repeating uridylic acid residue, coded for a polypeptide chain encoding just one kind of amino acid, phenylalanine. In scientific terms, he discovered that polyU codes for polyphenylalanine and hence the coding unit for this amino acid is composed of a series of Us or, as we now know the genetic code is read in triplets, the codon for phenylalanine is UUU. This single experiment opened the way to the solution of the genetic code. It was for this and later work on the genetic code for which Nirenberg shared the Nobel Prize for Medicine and Physiology. In addition, Matthaei and his co-workers in the following years published a multitude of results concerning the early understanding of the form and function of the genetic code.

Why Matthaei, who personally deciphered the genetic code, was excluded from this scientific prize is one of the Nobel Prize controversies.

Later, Matthaei was a member of the Max Planck Society in Göttingen as a director.

Bibliography

References

See also
 Rheinische Friedrich-Wilhelms-Universität Bonn
 German inventors and discoverers
 Genetic code

German biochemists
History of genetics
1929 births
Living people
University of Bonn alumni
Max Planck Institute directors